Jeroen Antonius Gerardus Groenendijk (born 20 July 1949, Amsterdam), is a Dutch logician, linguist and philosopher, working on philosophy of language, formal semantics, pragmatics.

Groenendijk wrote a joint Ph.D. dissertation with Martin Stokhof on the formal semantics of questions, under the supervision of Renate Bartsch and Johan van Benthem. He was also an important figure in the development of dynamic semantics (together with Stokhof, Veltman and others, following earlier work by Irene Heim and Hans Kamp). His current work is mainly focused on studying and developing the recently founded framework of inquisitive semantics.

He is a former director of the Institute for Logic, Language and Computation (ILLC) at the University of Amsterdam and a member of the group collectively publishing under the pseudonym L. T. F. Gamut.

References

External links
 Groenendijk's university homepage
 Inquisitive Semantics project homepage

1949 births
Living people
Dutch logicians
Philosophers of language
20th-century Dutch philosophers
Academic staff of the University of Amsterdam
University of Amsterdam alumni
Writers from Amsterdam